Brahma Temple or Brahmaji Mandir is a Hindu temple dedicated to Brahma in Khedbrahma, Gujarat, India. It is built in third quarter of the 11th century.

History
The temples dedicated to Brahma are uncommon in India. According to M. A. Dhaky, it was built in third quarter of the 11th century during the reign of Chaulukya king Karna.

Architecture

The east facing Brahma temple is situated in the middle of the village. 

The spire, mandapa (dome) and doorway must have been destroyed which are rebuilt later in bricks and mortar. It is built of white sandstone and cement-covered bricks. It is 57 feet long, 30 feet broad, and 36 feet high. The sanctum is 32 feet wide which is navaratha in anga and hastangula in plan and is of fully decorated class. Its pitha (base), the vedibandha and the mandovara (middle part of the wall) is resemble to the temple at Sunak. The lower part of main shrine is intact and is filled with images of gods, goddesses and apsaras. These images in jangha portion are poorly retouched. The chauri-bearers on nandika are elegantly carved which are common in 11th century temples. The phansana roof resembles Vimala Vasahi temple and is crowned with a ghanta. There are images of Brahma in the niches on the three sides. The modern mandapa hall has four pillars reused from the original mandapa. They are octagonal and has carvings of bells and chains with band of kirtimukha faces on the top. The doorway can be original or the modern one. It has floral patterns and minor sculptures. The dedicatory block in the centre has Ganesha.

The interior has no ornamental carvings. The image of three-faced and four-armed standing Brahma is 1.8 m (5' 6") high. There are goose on either sides of the image. The image seems later installation or the older image plaster with cement to merge broken parts.

Gallery

See also 

 Brahma Vav

References

11th-century Hindu temples
Hindu temples in Gujarat
Khedbrahma
Brahma temples
Sabarkantha district
Māru-Gurjara architecture